Mathieu Scarpelli (born 23 July 1981) is a French football striker who has played in Ligue 1 and Ligue 2.

Career
Born in Grenoble, Isère, Scarpelli began playing football in Grenoble Foot 38's youth academy. He would play for amateur sides FC Échirolles and SO Cassis Carnoux before turning professional with AC Ajaccio.

He played in Ligue 1 with AC Ajaccio. He spent two years with EA Guingamp, playing the 2009–10 UEFA Europa League and scoring 15 goals in Championnat National during his second season with the club. In July 2011, Scarpelli joined Championnat National rivals Étoile Fréjus Saint-Raphaël.

References

External links 
Player profile - EAG UK

1981 births
Living people
Sportspeople from Grenoble
French footballers
Ligue 1 players
Ligue 2 players
Championnat National players
AC Ajaccio players
LB Châteauroux players
En Avant Guingamp players
SO Cassis Carnoux players
FC Échirolles players
Association football forwards
Footballers from Auvergne-Rhône-Alpes